Barnaul is a city and the administrative center of Altai Krai, Russia.

Barnaul may also refer to:
Barnaul Urban Okrug, a municipal formation which the city of krai significance of Barnaul in Altai Krai, Russia is incorporated as
Barnaul Airport, an airport in Altai Krai, Russia
Barnaul Cartridge Plant, a manufacturer of industrial goods and ammunition in Barnaul, Altai Krai, Russia.
Barnaul meteorite, a meteorite that fell in Russia in 1904
Barnaul (inhabited locality), several inhabited localities in Russia